The 2014–15 UAE President's Cup is the 39th season of the UAE President's Cup, the premier knockout tournament for association football clubs in the United Arab Emirates. winners will qualify for the group stage of the 2016 AFC Champions League.

Round of 16
Al Wahda 2-2 (P) Dubai

Dibba Al Fujairah 0-5 Al Ain

Al Ahli 2-1 Al Ittihad Kalba

Al Jazira 2-3 Ajman

Al Fujairah 1-1 (P) Al Dhafra

Bani Yas 3-1 Al Wasl

Emirates 2-5 Al Shabab

Al Sharjah 0-1 (E) Al Nasr

Quarter-finals
Al Nasr 1-0 Al Ain

Dubai 3-5 (E) Al Ahli

Al Shabab (P) 1-1 Bani Yas

Al Dhafra 2-0 Ajman

Semi-finals
Al Nasr (P) 1-1 Al Shabab

Al Dhafra 0-2 Al Ahli

Final

3 June 2015

Al Nasr (1-1) Al Ahli
        (3-0) Penalties

Al Nasr won UAE President's Cup

References

External links
2014–15 UAE President's Cup, Soccerway.com

Uae President's Cup
UAE President's Cup seasons